Live And More Encore is a live album released by Donna Summer in 1999, an edited version of a televised concert of the same name. Released on Sony Music's sublabel Epic, it featured a live concert which had been filmed especially for the VH-1 channel, and also two new dance tracks, including a re-working of "Time To Say Goodbye", a semi-classical song previously made popular by Andrea Bocelli and Sarah Brightman. Summer's dance version of the song was entitled "I Will Go with You (Con te partirò)". Both of the album's two studio recordings, the other being "Love Is the Healer", reached #1 on the US dance charts, with "I Will Go With You" nominated for a Grammy as Best Dance Recording.

In the concert Summer performs some of her biggest hits both from the 1970s disco era through to the 1980s. The song "No More Tears (Enough Is Enough)", originally a duet with Barbra Streisand, is performed with Australian singer Tina Arena. The song was one of the concert's highlights, earning enthusiastic applause from the audience. Another notable moment is when Summer tells how she wrote "Dim All the Lights" for Rod Stewart, but at the last minute decided to keep it for herself. She then performs the first half of the song the way she imagines Stewart might have sung it, and finishes it in the style she originally recorded it.

in 2013, the album was re-released without the studio tracks as Playlist: The Very Best of Donna Summer, including bonus songs only previously available on the accompanying video release.

Track listing

Live & More Encore
"MacArthur Park" (Webb) – 6:38
"This Time I Know It's for Real"  (Aitken, Stock, Summer, Waterman) – 3:12
"I Feel Love" (Bellotte, Moroder, Summer) – 3:50
"On the Radio" (Moroder, Summer) – 4:29
"No More Tears (Enough Is Enough)" – duet with Tina Arena (Jabara, Roberts) – 4:21
"Dim All the Lights"  (Summer) – 6:03
"She Works Hard for the Money" (Omartian, Summer) – 4:31
"Bad Girls" (Esposito, Hokenson, Sudano, Summer) – 3:06
"Hot Stuff"  (Bellotte, Faltermeyer, Forsey) – 4:19
"My Life"  (Barry, Miller, Summer, Waterman) – 5:58
"Last Dance" (Jabara) – 7:08
"Love Is the Healer" (DiGesare, Summer) – 3:23
"I Will Go with You (Con te partirò)"  (Quarantotto, Sartori, Summer) – 4:10

Playlist: The Very Best of Donna Summer
"MacArthur Park" (Webb) – 6:38
"This Time I Know It's for Real"  (Aitken, Stock, Summer, Waterman) – 3:11
"I Feel Love" (Bellotte, Moroder, Summer) – 3:31
"On the Radio" (Moroder, Summer) – 3:59
"No More Tears (Enough Is Enough)" – duet with Tina Arena (Jabara, Roberts) – 5:04
"If There Is Music There" – 5:34
"Riding Through The Storm" – 6:15
"Don't Wanna Work" – 4:44
"Nobody" – 5:41
"Dim All the Lights"  (Summer) – 6:07
"She Works Hard for the Money" (Omartian, Summer) – 4:31
"Bad Girls" (Esposito, Hokenson, Sudano, Summer) – 2:51
"Hot Stuff"  (Bellotte, Faltermeyer, Forsey) – 4:32
"Last Dance" (Jabara) – 7:01

Charts and certifications

Weekly charts

Singles

Certifications and sales

References

1999 live albums
Donna Summer live albums
Epic Records live albums
Albums recorded at the Hammerstein Ballroom